Ruellia humilis (wild petunia, fringeleaf wild petunia, hairy petunia, low wild petunia) is a species of flowering plant in the family Acanthaceae. It is native to the eastern United States. It is grown as an ornamental plant.

Ruellia humilis is native to the U.S. from the northeastern/northern central to the southeastern/southern central regions. According to the Germplasm Resources Information Network of the United States Department of Agriculture, Ruellia humilis is native to the following states:

Alabama, Arkansas, Georgia, Illinois, Indiana, Iowa, (eastern) Kansas, Kentucky, Louisiana, Maryland, Michigan, (southeastern) Minnesota, Mississippi, Missouri, Nebraska, (western) North Carolina, Ohio, Oklahoma, Pennsylvania, Tennessee, (eastern) Texas, West Virginia, Wisconsin, and Virginia.

It is not well-known or used much in conventional nurseries or gardens, but use in gardens has been increasing as native plants become more popular. It is usually about one foot high, but can get to two feet high. Its opposite leaves are to 2.5 inches long by 1 inch wide and are light green to medium green with smooth margins and are covered with soft white hairs on both sides. The funnel-shaped 5-lobed flowers are about 1.5 to 2.5 inches in diameter and do resemble petunias, as does the rest of the plant. The lavender flowers bloom in July into September and open in the morning and fall off in the evening.

Scientific Characteristics 
In regards to the overall scientific characteristics of Ruellia humilis, the species is expected to behave normally with other species in surrounding ecological systems. The plant has been observed to have a high level of richness of arbuscular mycorrhizal fungi(AMF) diversity when located in calcareous plots as compared to acidic plots. This will occur rather frequently as such plots can be found in grassland ecological systems, which can be found with ease in the states where the plant inhabits.

As with any other biological entity, Ruellia humilis also has certain characteristics that impact its plant virus composition. A study published in Virus Evolution Journal set out to study and identify which biological factors affects the virus composition the most. The factors examined in the study include host identify, location, and time effects. The results showed that the host identity effects has a much more consistent impact on the composition of the plant virus than the other factors.

With the general exclusive presence of Ruellia humilis in the United States set, there is more data that indicates, more specifically, the type of biome and regions that this plant shows up in more often. One case study sampling from Buettner Xeric Limestone Prairies, Illinois, Monroe County revealed that when comparing frequency of the plant, the plant had 70% presence in the eastern region of prairie and only 3% in the western region prairie. To place this data in perspective, the eastern region's vegetation covered about 38% of the surface while the western region's vegetation covered about 33.5% of its surface. Both regions' "rock was between 17% and 19%, and bare ground and litter was from 40% to 44%."

References

Further reading

 

humilis
Flora of the Eastern United States
Garden plants
Flora of Alabama